The qualifying competition for 2010 Men's European Water Polo Championship is a series of competitions to decide the qualifiers for 2010 Men's European Water Polo Championship.

Qualification

12 teams were allowed to the tournament. The qualification was as follows:
 The worst 6 teams from the 2008 European Championships
 The best 6 teams from the 2009 Men II

Draw

Pots

Groups

Groups

Group A

Group B

Group C

References

External links

Archives todor66
Archives Poland Water Polo

Men
Men's European Water Polo Championship
Euro